Faye E. McWatt is Associate Chief Justice of the Superior Court of Justice (Ontario) .  She was first appointed to the bench in 2000.  On December 21, 2020, Prime Minister Justin Trudeau announced her appointment as Associate Chief Justice of the Superior Court of Justice of Ontario, replacing the Honourable Frank Marrocco.

References

Canadian judges
Year of birth missing (living people)
Living people
Judges in Ontario